The 20th Academy Awards were held on March 20, 1948, to honor the films of 1947. It is notable for being the last Oscars until 2005 in which no film won more than three awards.

Rosalind Russell was highly favored to win Best Actress for her performance in Mourning Becomes Electra, but Loretta Young won instead for The Farmer's Daughter.

James Baskett received an Academy Honorary Award for his portrayal of Uncle Remus in Song of the South, which made him the first African-American man, and the first actor in a Disney film, to win an Academy Award for acting.

Winning Best Supporting Actor at age 71, Edmund Gwenn became the oldest Oscar winner, taking the record from Charles Coburn, who was 66 at the time of his win in 1943 for The More the Merrier.

Awards

Nominees were announced on February 13, 1948. Winners are listed first and highlighted in boldface.

Academy Honorary Awards
 James Baskett "for his able and heart-warming characterization of Uncle Remus, friend and story teller to the children of the world in Walt Disney's Song of the South".
 Bill and Coo "in which artistry and patience blended in a novel and entertaining use of the medium of motion pictures".
 Colonel William N. Selig, Albert E. Smith, Thomas Armat and George K. Spoor members of "the small group of pioneers whose belief in a new medium, and whose contributions to its development, blazed the trail along which the motion picture has progressed, in their lifetime, from obscurity to world-wide acclaim".

Best Foreign Language Film
 Shoeshine (Italy)

Presenters
 Anne Baxter (Presenter: Best Cinematography, Best Supporting Actor, Best Screenplay and Best Film Editing)
 Ingrid Bergman (Presenter: Honorary Award to James Baskett)
 Donald Crisp (Presenter: Best Supporting Actress and Best Director)
 Olivia de Havilland (Presenter: Best Actor)
 Jean Hersholt (Presenter: Honorary Awards)
 Fredric March (Presenter: Best Actress and Best Picture)
 Robert Montgomery (Presenter: Scientific & Technical Awards)
 Agnes Moorehead (Presenter: Best Cinematography)
 George Murphy (Presenter: Writing Awards)
 Larry Parks (Presenter: Best Special Effects, Best Musical Score and Best Sound Recording)
 Dick Powell (Presenter: Best Art Direction)
 Dinah Shore (Presenter: Best Original Song)
 Shirley Temple (Presenter: Documentary Awards and Short Subject Awards)

Performers
 Dennis Day
 Frances Langford
 Gordon MacRae
 Johnny Mercer
 Dinah Shore

Multiple nominations and awards

The following 16 films received multiple nominations:
 8 nominations: Gentleman's Agreement
 5 nominations: The Bishop's Wife, Crossfire, and Great Expectations
 4 nominations: A Double Life, Green Dolphin Street, Life with Father, and Miracle on 34th Street
 3 nominations: Body and Soul and Mother Wore Tights
 2 nominations: Black Narcissus; The Farmer's Daughter; Kiss of Death; Mourning Becomes Electra; Smash-Up, the Story of a Woman; and Song of the South

The following five films received multiple awards:
 3 wins: Gentleman's Agreement and Miracle on 34th Street
 2 wins: Black Narcissus, A Double Life and Great Expectations

See also
 5th Golden Globe Awards
 1947 in film
 1st British Academy Film Awards
 2nd Tony Awards

References

Academy Awards ceremonies
1947 film awards
1948 in Los Angeles
1948 in American cinema
March 1948 events in the United States